Wolfgang George Frederick Franz von Pfalz-Neuburg (5 June 1659 – 4 June 1683) was an Auxiliary Bishop in the Diocese of Köln and elected Prince-Bishop of Breslau (Wrocław) shortly before his death.

Life
Born in Düsseldorf, he was the fifth child but second son of Philip William, Elector Palatine and Landgravine Elisabeth Amalie of Hesse-Darmstadt.

Since his older brother Johann Wilhelm was to succeed his father in all the secular offices, he was destined for the church. Wolfgang Georg was appointed Auxiliary bishop of Köln and later elected Prince-Bishop of the Diocese of Breslau (Wrocław); however, he suddenly died before the coming election by a papal audience in Rome, one day before his 25th birthday in Wiener Neustadt.

He was buried in the Hofkirche in Neuburg an der Donau. In the St. George Cathedral of Wiener Neustadt reminds a grave stone at him. In his place, his younger brother was Franz Ludwig appointed Prince-Bishop of Breslau.

Ancestry

References
Hans und Marga Rall: Die Wittelsbacher in Lebensbildern, Graz/Vienna/Köln 1986, Edition Kreuzlingen 2000

1659 births
1683 deaths
Nobility from Düsseldorf
Wolfgang George Frederick
Clergy from North Rhine-Westphalia
Sons of monarchs